Deputy Commissioner (popularly abbreviated to "DC") or District Magistrate (জেলা প্রশাসক ও জেলা ম্যাজিস্ট্রেট) is the chief administrative and revenue officer of a district or an administrative sub-unit of a division. According to the Code of Criminal Procedure of Bangladesh, the Government shall appoint as many persons as it thinks fit to be Executive Magistrates and shall appoint one of them to be the District Magistrate.

The term District Magistrate is used in the Criminal procedure code to denote the principal executive magistrate of the district. However, after 1960, the Deputy Commissioner term came to prominence throughout the country. During the early year, before Bangladesh era, the deputy commissioner's office used to be concerned with internal security and revenue administration. Over the time, however, the office has become increasingly occupied with the general welfare of the people in the district. The Deputy Commissioner is a representative of the Government in the field of law and order, land administration, disaster management and general and local elections. The Deputy Commissioner works under the general guidance and supervision of the Divisional Commissioner. They are under the administrative control of the Cabinet Division although their posting and transfer are made by the Ministry of Public Administration. The Deputy commissioners are appointed from the members of the Bangladesh Civil Service (Administration).
known as Bangladesh Administrative Service

References

 Office of District Commissioner Job Circular (জেলা প্রশাসকের কার্যালয়) (Bangla)

Civil service in Bangladesh
Public administration
Politics of Bangladesh